Jab'a is a Palestinian village in the central West Bank, located 17 kilometers north of Hebron and 15 kilometers southwest of Bethlehem. Located three kilometers east of the Green Line, it is located in the Seam Zone, surrounded by the Israeli settlements in the Gush Etzion Regional Council and the Israeli West Bank barrier. Nearby Palestinian towns and villages include Surif adjacent to the Jaba'a, Wadi Fukin and Nahalin to the north. It is the northernmost locality in the Hebron Governorate. According to the Palestinian Central Bureau of Statistics, Jab'a had a population of approximately 896 in 2007.  Jab'a has a total land area of 10,099 dunams, of which 1,002 dunams as built-up area.

History
Jab'a dates back to the Canaanites. The village is mentioned in Eusebius' renowned work, Onomasticon, as Gabatha [Gava'ot] (Γαβαθα), believed by historical geographer, Samuel Klein, to be Jab'a southeast of Bayt Nattif. Jab'a has been identified by Conder as the biblical site of Gibeah,  Although not conclusive, it is said to be the burial-site of Habakuk the prophet. Elsewhere Eusebius purports that Habakuk was buried near a place called Ενκηλα (`Ain Qe'ilah), seven miles from Bayt Jibrin, and which place is now called Khirbet Qila.  Byzantine ceramics have been found here.

Ottoman era
In 1596, Jaba appeared in Ottoman tax registers as being in the Nahiya of Quds of the Liwa of Quds, with a population of 3 Muslim households. The villagers paid a fixed tax-rate of 33,3 %  on wheat, barley, olives, and goats or beehives;  a total of 1,110 akçe.

In 1863, the French explorer Victor Guérin   found Jab'a reduced  to a hundred souls, while the Palestine Exploration Fund's  Survey of Western Palestine  described Jeba in 1883   as "a small village standing upon a high, narrow ridge, with a steep valley to the north. The houses are of stone. To the east are caves in the face of the rock."

British  Mandate of Palestine era
In the 1922 census of Palestine conducted  by the British Mandate authorities, Al Jaba'a had a population of 122 inhabitants, all Muslims.  while at the time of the 1931 census,  El Jab'a had a population of 176, still Muslim, living in a total of 36 houses.

Jordanian era
In the wake of the 1948 Arab–Israeli War, and after the 1949 Armistice Agreements, Jab’a came under  Jordanian rule.

The Jordanian census of 1961 found 332 inhabitants.

1967 and aftermath
Since the Six-Day War in 1967, Jab'a has been held under Israeli occupation.

After the 1995 accords, 3.5% of village land was classified as Area B land, while the remaining 96.5% was classified as Area C. Israel has put Jab'a inside the Gush Etzion block, effectively isolating it from its Palestinian neighbours. The Israeli West Bank barrier will extend on Al Jab’a lands, isolating 90% of Jab'a's land from the village.

On 25 February 2015, in an apparent price tag attack, a mosque in the village was torched. Israeli police were investigating it. The attack coincided with the anniversary of the Cave of the Patriarchs massacre that took place in Hebron 21 years ago. The fire was discovered by worshipers who quickly extinguished it. The carpets and walls were damaged but no one was reported to have been injured. Graffiti in Hebrew called for "revenge attacks" against Arabs and Muslims, according to eyewitnesses.

In October 2020, Israeli settlers destroyed 300 olive trees in the northern part of the village.

The village houses are small and consist of just one spacious room surrounded by a large area of farmland, on which almonds and olives grapes and are cultivated.

References

Bibliography

External links
Welcome To al-Jab'a, Palestine Remembered
Jaba, Welcome to Palestine
Survey of Western Palestine, Map 17:   IAA, Wikimedia commons
 Al Jab'a Village (Fact Sheet), Applied Research Institute–Jerusalem, ARIJ
 Al Jab’a Village, ARIJ
Al Jab'a aerial photo, ARIJ
The priorities and needs for development in Al Jab’a village based on the community and the local authorities’ assessment, ARIJ
Al Jab’a

Seam Zone
Bethlehem Governorate
Villages in the West Bank